Yolanda Eliisa Ngarambe (born 14 September 1991) is a Swedish-Finnish middle-distance runner, competing for Sweden.

She won the 3,000 metres at 2019 European Team Championships in Bydgoszcz, Poland.

Early life
Ngarambe was born to a Banyarwanda father from Uganda and a Finnish mother. She has dual citizenship of Finland and Sweden.

References

External links

1991 births
Living people
Swedish female middle-distance runners
Swedish people of Finnish descent
Swedish people of Ugandan descent
Swedish people of Rwandan descent
World Athletics Championships athletes for Sweden
Swedish Athletics Championships winners